La Esperanza Airport  is an airport serving the cities of La Esperanza and Intibucá in the Intibucá Department of Honduras.

There is rising terrain northwest and southeast of the runway.

See also

 List of airports in Honduras
 Transport in Honduras

References

External links
 HERE Maps - La Esperanza
 OpenStreetMap - La Esperanza
 OurAirports - La Esperanza

Airports in Honduras